Gelang Patah or Glang Patah may refer to:
Gelang Patah
Gelang Patah (federal constituency)
Gelang Patah (state constituency), formerly represented in the Johor State Legislative Assembly (1959–95)